The 1991 European 300 m Rifle Championships was the 7th edition of the 300 m rifle competition, European 300 m Rifle Championships, organised by the International Shooting Sport Federation as a stand-alone championships.

Results

Men

Medal table

See also
 European Shooting Confederation
 International Shooting Sport Federation
 ISSF shooting events
 List of medalists at the European Shooting Championships
 List of medalists at the European Shotgun Championships

References

External links
 
 European Champion Archive Results at Sport-komplett-de

European Shotgun Championships
European 300 m Rifle Championships